František Rosmaisl-Majzl (25 April 1884 – 9 May 1945) was a Czech footballer who played as a striker.

Club career
Rosmaisl began his career with Smíchov in 1904, before moving to Slavia Prague in 1906. Rosmaisl played for Slavia Prague until 1914.

International career
On 1 April 1906, Rosmaisl made his debut for Bohemia in Bohemia's second game, starting in a 1–1 draw against Hungary. It was Rosmaisl's only cap for Bohemia.

Notes

References

1884 births
1945 deaths
People from Uhlířské Janovice
Association football forwards
Czech footballers
Czechoslovak footballers
SK Slavia Prague players
Bohemia international footballers
Sportspeople from the Central Bohemian Region
Sportspeople from the Austro-Hungarian Empire